Manuel Pio Correia (1874–1934) was a Portuguese botanist. 

Correia's study into botany focused primarily on the scientific, economic, and industrial means of crop production.

He had a wife, Mercedes Veloso, and a son, Manuel Pio Correia Jr. At the time of his death, Correia was a researcher at the Museum of Natural History in Paris.

1874 births
1934 deaths
20th-century Portuguese botanists
19th-century Portuguese botanists
People from Porto